Ewan is an unincorporated community in Whitman County, Washington, United States.

References

Unincorporated communities in Whitman County, Washington
Unincorporated communities in Washington (state)